Shamlaji, also spelled Shamalaji, is a major Hindu pilgrimage centre in Aravalli district of Gujarat state of India. The Shamlaji temple is dedicated to Vishnu. Several other Hindu temples are located nearby.

The present temple dedicated to Shamlaji, a form of Vishnu was perhaps started in the 11th century in Chaulukya style, but the present structure dates from the 15th-16th centuries.  The sculpture of Vishnu in the sanctuary is probably seventh-8th century, and the small temple opposite houses a sixth-century sculpture of Shiva.  The oldest intact temple is the small ninth-century Harishchandrani Chauri Temple, with a gateway nearby.  Several ruins of temples, scattered idols and old brick-works surrounding the place establishes antiquity of the place.

This site dates to the Mauryan period, and a much older microlith site known as Dhek-Vadlo locally was found near Shamlaji.

Shamlaji was an important Hindu centre in the sixth century, probably the home of a sculpture workshop whose creations are found as far away as Mumbai, where the Parel Relief was found.  Most of the ancient sculpture found at Shamlaji, in blueish schist, has now been removed to museums, especially to Mumbai and Vadodara.

Shamlaji temple

Shamlaji temple is located on the banks of the Meshvo river in the valley surrounded by well wooded hills. It is also referred to as Dholi Dhajawala due to white silk flag fluttering on top of the temple.

Built of white sandstone and brick it is surrounded by a wall with a gateway. It is of two stories, supported on pillars, and a canopy with arches on each side. The lower courses of richly carved stone are of great age. Above them runs a frieze with an unintelligible pattern, and, above this, running right round the building, a fringe of elephants' heads and forequarters carved in stone. Above this is a very ranch worn frieze full of figures in bass-relief, men on horseback with bows, and animals. The elephant is a very frequent emblem. Besides the fringe frieze above mentioned, there are, on the outer wall, between every two angles, larger figures of semi-rampant elephants standing out in relief, and, in front of the entrance, stands on either side of the doorway a gigantic cement elephant. Above the shrine, a pyramid-based tower rises into a spire like a high-shouldered cone with flattened sides. The forepart of the roof consists of a number of small domes springing from a flat roof, or rather of a flat trabeate roof, with domes here and there, the largest being in the centre. Outside at all the angles of the roof are figures of animals and the gargoyles. On walls, there are some scenes from the epics Mahabharata and Ramayana.

Of the two inscriptions, one is to the left in the upper story and bears date 94 AD and 102 AD. This writing, cut in stone, is not very archaic and could not be of the date it professes to record. It may be a transcript of an older inscription or the record of an old tradition. The other, on copper at the entrance of the temple, records repairs executed in 1762 AD by the then Thakor of Tintoi. From these two inscriptions, name of the deity seems to be Gadadharji, the holder of the club, a well known title of Vishnu, Krishna, or Shamlaji. The cow idols are also worshiped depictiong childhood of Krishna as cowherd. It is one of the 154 important pilgrimage sites of Vaishnavism.

The temple was claimed by Jains in the past. Years ago the Idar State rulers gave the fiefdom of Shamlaji temple to the Modhari Rao Saheb with other villages like Revdar, Devdar, Napada, Khalsa, Sunsar, Modhari, etc. The Rao of Modhari still holds trusteeship of Shamlaji Temple.

Other places of interest
 
Near the Shamlaji temple the river forms deep pools, much resorted to by persons bewitched or devil-possessed. To the north the waters of the Karmanu pond, and the Surya reservoir have the property of washing away sin.

Nearby Old Shamlaji temple is said to have been the original temple. The temple dedicated to Somnarayan, is, except the adytum, open on all sides, with a flat ceiling, surmounted by a pyramidal roof, supported on plain square stone pillars with carved capitals. Part of the shrine walls seem to have been formed of a series of upright stone slabs with sculptured figures in low relief. Many of these still remain. The most curious thing about the building is that, at the front and rear and both sides, in the centre of the facade the roof ends in a triangular pediment composed of boldly sculptured figures. Inside the building near the shrine, and, on the left hand as one faces it, is a remarkable human head in high relief standing out from the base of the span of an arch. The features are more human-looking than those generally seen in Hindu temples, and the arrangement of the hair is curious. There is a corresponding face on the other side but it is much worn or broken, while this is fresh and clear in its lines. In the shrine, part of the original altar or image seat still remains. It has been roughly heightened by bricks loosely piled on it, and on the raised superstructure stands a slab with a representation said to be of Somnarayan. This slab probably originally formed part of the outer wall of the shrine.

Kashi Vishwanath Mahadev temple, is seven feet below ground level and its pyramidal roof rise to the level of the land round it. It is entered through a gateway by a gradually deepening passage. Perhaps the temple was originally built in a hollow which has filled up. It
looks old though not so old as Somnarayan' s the most ancient looking building in the place. In a small shrine between the Shamlaji temple and the river, late-Gupta period idol of standing Ganesha is worshiped. Trilokeshwar is a small temple opposite the Shamlaji temple dedicated to Shiva having idol with trident. On the opposite bank of the river, there is a temple dedicated to Ranchhodji, another form of Krishna.

The temple at Harishchandra ni Chori dates back to tenth century. The structure is enclosed within courtyard with lost walls except the ornamental gateway (Torana). There is a rectangular sanctum and a large pavilion in front of it.

Devni Mori,  from Shamlaji, has remains of a Buddhist monastery dated to third-fourth century. The inscribed casket with body relics of Buddha was found from the Stupa excavated here.

The tomb of Navgaja Pir, a maulvi, is revered by many tribals.

Shyamalvan is a theme-based garden developed by Forest Department of Government of Gujarat. It was inaugurated by then Chief Minister of Gujarat, Narendra Modi, on 18 July 2009.

Fair

A large annual fair is held on Kartik Sud 15th (October). The tribal community revers the Shamlaji as Kaliyo Dev or the Dark Divine. The large number of devotees visit the place and bathe in the river. Silver ornaments, metalwares, clothes and household items are sold during the fair.

Connectivity
Shamlaji is around 20 km from Bhiloda and 29 km from Modasa. Located off National Highway 8, Shamlaji is frequented by state transport buses from Himmatnagar and Ahmedabad.

Train : Shamlaji Road railway station is nearest (14 km) railway station to Shamlaji. There are two daily passenger trains operated by the Indian railways on meter gauge track.

Notes

References
 
Michell, George (1990), The Penguin Guide to the Monuments of India, Volume 1: Buddhist, Jain, Hindu, 1990, Penguin Books, 
Sara L. Schastok, The Śāmalājī Sculptures and sixth Century Art in Western India, Brill, 1985, .

External links

Villages in Aravalli district
Hindu temples in Gujarat
11th-century Hindu temples
11th-century establishments in India
Vishnu temples